Echeta pandiona is a moth of the family Erebidae. It was described by Caspar Stoll in 1782. It is found in Suriname.

References

Phaegopterina
Moths described in 1782